Élise, Elise, Elyse or Elize is the shortened feminine French form of Elizabeth, coming originally from the Hebrew name אלישבע (אלי = My God שבע = oath) and meaning "My God is an oath" or "My God is abundance".

People

Élise
 Élise Bruyère (1776–1847), a French painter who specialized in portraits and floral still lives
 Élise Bussaglia (born 1985), French football player
 Élise Crombez (born 1982), Belgian fashion model
 Élise Fajgeles (born 1970), French politician
 Élise Guilbault (born 1961), Canadian film and television actress
 Élise Lucet (born 1963), French investigative journalist and television host
 Élise Paré-Tousignant (1937–2018), Canadian music educator and administrator
 Élise Rivet (1890–1945), French World War II heroine
 Élise Turcotte (born 1957), Canadian writer

Elise
 Elise Allen, American author, TV producer and screenwriter 
 Elise Averdieck (1808–1907), German social activist 
 Elise Burgin (born 1962), American tennis player
 Elise Christie (born 1990), British short-track speed-skater
 Elise Frösslind (1793–1862), Swedish opera singer
 Elise Hall (born 1989), American politician
 Princess Elise of Hohenlohe-Langenburg (1864–1929), member of the German royal family
 Elise Holst (1811–1891), Danish stage actress
 Elise Hwasser (1831–1894), Swedish actress
 Elise Thérèse Koekkoek-Daiwaille (1814–1891), Dutch painter and lithographer
 Elise Mertens (born 1995), Belgian tennis player
 Elise Mourant (1921–1990), New Zealand artist
 Elise Neal (born 1970), American actress
 Elise Norwood (born 1981), Australian water polo player
 Elise Richter (1865–1943), Austrian professor of philology
 Elisabeth Röckel (1793–1883), German soprano, possible dedicatee of Für Elise
 Elise Stefanik (born 1984), American politician
 Elise Testone (born 1983), American singer and songwriter
 Elise Varner Winter (1926-2021), American political hostess and activist
 Elise Wortley (born 1990), British explorer

Elyse
 Elyse Knox (1917–2012), American actress, model, and fashion designer
 Elyse Levesque (born 1985), Canadian actress
 Elyse Willems (born 1986), Canadian internet personality

Elize
 EliZe (born 1982), born Elise van der Horst, Dutch singer-songwriter
 Elize Cawood (1952–2020), South African actress
 Elize Hele (1560–1635), English lawyer and philanthropist
 Elize Kotze, head coach of the South Africa national netball team
 Elize Ryd (born 1984), Swedish musician
 Elize du Toit (born 1981), British actress

Fictional characters
 Elise the Dancing Girl, a title character in the Japanese short story "The Dancing Girl"
 Elise the Spider Queen, a playable champion character in the video game League of Legends
 Princess Elise the Third, a major character and love interest of Sonic in the 2006 video game Sonic the Hedgehog
 Elise, the youngest princess of Nohr in the 2015 video game Fire Emblem Fates
 Elise Schwarzer, in the Trails of Cold Steel series
 Élise de la Serre, a supporting character in the video game Assassin's Creed Unity
 Elyse Keaton, a main character on the American sitcom Family Ties, played by Meredith Baxter
 Elise, in The Astounding Wolf-Man comic book series
 Elise, in the video game Dead or Alive Xtreme Venus Vacation
 Princess Elise, a playable protagonist in the 2008 video game My World, My Way
Elise, a supporting antagonist in the 2012 manga and 2016 anime series Bungo Stray Dogs

See also
 Elise (disambiguation)
 Elisa (given name)
 Eliza (given name)

French feminine given names

pt:Elise